San Marco in Sylvis is a Roman Catholic church located in Afragola, Metropolitan city of Naples, region of Campania, Italy.

History
A church at the site is first documented from 1179, patronized by King William II of Sicily. The church has undergone various reconstructions over the centuries, including a major refurbishment in 1563 It contains a series of 16th century frescoes. It putatively contains a stone upon which St Mark sat, which is venerated for its ability to heal the sick through miracles.

References

References

12th-century Roman Catholic church buildings in Italy
Churches in the Metropolitan City of Naples